Martyrs' Day are days observed by countries to recognise martyrs such as soldiers, revolutionaries or victims of genocide. Below is a list of various Martyrs' Days for different countries.

Afghanistan 
Martyrs' Day is observed on September 8 or 9 (variable), the anniversary of Ahmad Shah Massoud's 2001 assassination. It has also been recognised officially by San Diego County, California, home to the highest concentration of Afghani immigrants and refugees in the United States.

Armenia 
Armenian Genocide Remembrance Day, on April 24 in Armenia, commemorates the Armenian genocide, which occurred from 1915 to 1923 in the Ottoman Empire.

Australia and New Zealand 
Anzac Day is a national day of remembrance in Australia and New Zealand that broadly commemorates all Australians and New Zealanders "who served and died in all wars, conflicts, and peacekeeping operations" and "the contribution and suffering of all those who have served". Observed on 25 April each year, Anzac Day was originally devised to honour the members of the Australian and New Zealand Army Corps (ANZAC) who served in the Gallipoli Campaign, their first engagement in the First World War (1914–1918).

Azerbaijan 
Martyrs' Day in Azerbaijan is observed on January 20, in memory of those killed in the Black January events.

Bangladesh 
Language Movement Day, also known as Language Martyrs' Day, on 21 February in Bangladesh, commemorates Bengali as a national language. 
Bengali Genocide Remembrance Day is observed on 25 March in Bangladesh to commemorate the victims of the Bengali Genocide of 1971, initially in 2017.
Martyred Intellectuals Day is observed on 14 December in Bangladesh to commemorate those intellectuals who were killed by Pakistani forces and their collaborators during the 1971 Liberation War, particularly on 14 December 1971.

Burkina Faso 
Martyrs' Day, on October 31, honors victims of the 2015 Burkinabé coup d'état.

Burma (Myanmar) 
Martyrs' Day, on July 19, commemorates the day when nine Burmese independence leaders were assassinated in 1947.

China 

Martyrs' Day (China) is celebrated on September 30, the eve of the National Day of the People's Republic of China, to commemorate those who lost their lives for the national and territorial integrity of the people of China. It was created by the National People's Congress in 2014.

Eritrea 
Martyrs' Day (Eritrea), is observed on June 20 of every year to honor the fallen heroes of Eritrea's warriors from the Yikealo and Warsay generations.

India 

Martyrs' Day (India), is observed on January 30, the anniversary of the Assassination of Mahatma Gandhi in 1948. The date was chosen as it marks the assassination of Mahatma Gandhi in 1948 by Nathuram Godse. On Martyr's Day the president, the vice president, the prime minister, the defence minister, and the three Service Chiefs gather at the samadhi at Raj Ghat memorial and lay wreaths decorated with multi-colour flowers. The armed forces personnel blow bugles sounding the Last Post. The inter-services contingent reverse arms as a mark of respect. A two-minute silence in memory of Indian martyrs is observed throughout the country at 11 AM. Participants hold all-religion prayers and sing tributes.

Lebanon 
Martyrs' Day (Lebanon and Syria), commemorates the execution of Lebanese and Syrian nationalists in Beirut (on what's now called Martyrs Square) by the Ottoman soldiers on May 6 1916 and martyrs of the Lebanese civil war, which took place from 1975 till 1990.

Libya 
16 September Martyrs' Day remembers Libyans killed or exiled under Italian rule and those who were killed in the 17 February revolution.

Madagascar 
Martyrs' Day in the country, observed every 29 March, commemorates the beginning of the 1947 Malagasy Uprising.

Malawi 
In Malawi, Martyrs' Day is celebrated on March 3 to honor the political heroes who gave their lives in the struggle against British colonialism.

Malaysia 
Warriors' Day is a day in Malaysia that commemorates the servicemen killed during the two World Wars and the Malayan Emergency. By extension, it honours all individuals who lost their lives in the line of duty throughout Malaysia's history.

Mali 

Martyrs' Day or Democracy Day is celebrated on March 26 and honors the victims of the 1991 Malian coup d'état.

Nepal 
In Nepal, Martyrs' Day is celebrated on  Magh 16 in the Hindu Vikram Samvat calendar. The month(s) of January and/or February corresponds to the month of Magh.

Martyr (Shahid) in Nepal is a term for some one who is executed while making contributions for the welfare of the country or society. The term was originally used for individuals who died while opposing the Rana Regime which was in place in the Kingdom of Nepal from 1846 until 1951. There are five martyrs in Nepal.

Lakhan Thapa is regarded as the first martyr of Nepal.

Netherlands 
Remembrance of the Dead is held annually on May 4 in the Netherlands. It commemorates all civilians and members of the armed forces of the Kingdom of the Netherlands who have died in wars or peacekeeping missions since the beginning of the Second World War.

Pakistan 
Martyrs' Day or Youm-e-Shuda is a Pakistani holiday held on 30 April to pay tribute to Pakistani military who died in service of their country.

Panama 
Martyrs' Day (Panama), is a Panamanian holiday which commemorates the January 9 1964 riots over sovereignty of the Panama Canal Zone.

São Tomé and Príncipe 
Dia dos Mártires da Liberdade, 3 February, commemorates the 1953 Batepá massacre.

South Sudan 
30 July is Martyr's Day in South Sudan commemoratign the death of John Garang de Mabior, leader of the Sudan People's Liberation Army during the Second Sudanese Civil War. Following a peace agreement, he briefly served as First Vice President of Sudan for three weeks until his death in a helicopter crash on July 30, 2005. Foul play in his death has never been proven, but July 30 is marked as Martyr's Day in South Sudan.

Syria 
Martyrs' Day (Lebanon and Syria), commemorates the execution of Syrian nationalists in Damascus by the Ottoman Empire on 6 May 1916.

Togo 
21 June honours all who struggled for the freedom of Togo. It is celebrated with a military parade in Lomé

Tunisia 
April 9, Martyr's Day remembers Tunisians killed in 1938.

Turkey 
March 18, is recognised in remembrance of Turkish soldiers fallen in action. It is on the same date Ottoman forces defeated a naval attack of the Allied Powers in Gallipoli Campaign during World War I on March 18, 1915.

Uganda 
In Uganda, Martyrs' Day is celebrated on June 3, mainly in honor of the Uganda Martyrs; Christian converts who were murdered for their religion in Uganda's biggest kingdom, Buganda in the late-1880s.

United Arab Emirates 
Martyrs' Day (United Arab Emirates) also known as Commemoration Day (United Arab Emirates) will be marked annually on November 30, recognising the sacrifices and dedication of Emirati martyrs who have given their life in the UAE and abroad in the field of civil, military and humanitarian service.

United States of America 
Memorial Day (originally known as Decoration Day) is a federal holiday in the United States for honoring and mourning the military personnel who have died in the performance of their military duties. Since 1971, the holiday is observed on the last Monday of May. The holiday was observed on May 30 from 1868 to 1970.

Vietnam 
The Memorial Day for War Martyrs is recognised on 27 July, in Vietnam.

References 

Types of secular holidays
January observances 
February observances 
March observances
April observances
May observances
June observances
July observances
September observances